Sgt. Smith, Sergeant Smith, or variation, may refer to:

People
Sgt Smith, rank
 Edward Smith (VC) (1898–1940) Victoria Cross recipient for action during WWI
 Elmelindo Rodrigues Smith (1935–1967) Medal of Honor recipient for action during the Vietnam War
 Henry Robert Smith, former Sergeants-at-Arms of the Canadian House of Commons
 Jimmie Todd Smith (born 1965) retired Staff Sergeant and Florida politician
 John Smith (sergeant) (1814–1864) Victoria Cross recipient for the Siege of Delhi.
 Larry Smith, former Sergeant at Arms of the United States Senate
 Maynard Harrison Smith (1911–1984) Medal of Honor recipient for a bombing raid over France.
 Paul Ray Smith (1969–2003) Medal of Honor recipient for Operation Iraqi Freedom.
 Sam Smith (painter) (1918–1999) U.S. Army artist Technical Sergeant during WWII
 Sean Smith (diplomat) (1978–2012) who left the USAF as a Staff Sergeant, to enter the foreign service 
 William Thomas Smith DCM MM (1896–1994) WWI flying ace

Sergeant Smith, name
 Seargent Smith Prentiss (1808–1850) Mississippi politician

Fictional characters
 Detective Sergeant Chad Smith, a character from The Smith Family (TV series)
 Dale Smith (The Bill), a character from The Bill who progressed from constable to inspector, serving time as sergeant

See also
 Smith (surname)
 List of people with surname Smith
 Smith (disambiguation)